A Night to Remember is the third studio album by American singer Cyndi Lauper, released on May 9, 1989, by Epic Records. The album was originally set to be released in 1988, under the name Kindred Spirit, but was delayed until 1989 and the songs from the initial project were reworked. Although the album managed to score a top-10 single, it did not enjoy the commercial success of her previous two albums, and was met with mixed-to-poor reviews and in interviews, Lauper refers to it as A Night to Forget.

Background and production
The album was originally conceptualized as a project called Kindred Spirit, due for release in October 1988, and was going to include the track "Hole in My Heart (All the Way to China)", but when that song and the film it was featured in, Vibes, were unsuccessful, the album was reworked. The original Kindred Spirit tracklist included 10 songs, eight of which were eventually included on the final album. The two songs that were removed were "Hole in My Heart," which would only appear on Japanese CD editions of A Night to Remember, and "Don't Look Back," written by Lauper and John Turi, which remains unreleased. The songs "A Night to Remember", "Dancing With a Stranger" and "I Don't Want to Be Your Friend" were added to the tracklist later on after the release date was pushed back to 1989, with the other songs being remixed some time between their original 1988 planned release date and their eventual release. Some proof sheets of the original album artwork exist with the alternate title and track listing.

"Unabbreviated Love," penned by Lauper, Dusty Micale and Franke Previte, was recorded for the album but only appeared on the B-side of the "My First Night Without You" single.

The photo used in the album's final cover artwork was taken at the intersection of Plymouth and Pearl Streets, just east of the Manhattan Bridge, in Brooklyn, New York.

Critical reception

Critically, the album was met with mixed-to-poor reviews. Stephen Thomas Erlewine from AllMusic website retrospectively gave the album two out of five stars and wrote that with the album Lauper tried "becoming a self-consciously "mature" singer/songwriter" and that the album's songs didn't "always work" except for "I Drove All Night" which made "a lasting impression" and illustrated "what Lauper was attempting to achieve with the record". Chris Heim of the Chicago Tribune pointed out that the album bears the same name as the 1958 film about the Titanic; he gave the album two and a half stars out of five and wrote that the "crisp" and "spunky" production and the "appealing" vocals "can't quite keep this album and its predictable pop love song cargo afloat." Rolling Stone and the Los Angeles Times singled out Lauper's voice as a strong point, while noting the material was inconsistent. Other reviewers were more harsh: The New York Times criticized A Night to Remember'''s "anonymous vocals, songs full of submissive cliches and slapdash production", while The Village Voice, in comparing the album to Lauper's previous work, declared "How embarrassing to have placed hope in this woman."Billboard magazine gave the album a 'spotlight' in its album reviews section for the May 20 1989 issue. Despite this, the album was described as having "somewhat unchallenging settings", though the lead single "I Drove All Night" was marked out as a "solid" start to the album campaign and album track "Like a Cat" was also highlighted as of interest.

In a review for Cyndi's 1997 album Sisters of Avalon, People magazine retrospectively described A Night to Remember as "joyless" and blamed the album for her decline in popularity, stating that the album caused "a large chunk of her considerable following" to move on.

Commercial performance
The album sold moderately well but did not compare to the enjoy the same commercial success of her two previous albums, despite the success of the album's lead single, "I Drove All Night", which became a Top 10 hit, her last in the U.S.A., earning Lauper a Grammy nomination. In the UK, however, A Night to Remember was Lauper's highest-charting album, peaking at No.9. According to the book St. James Encyclopedia of Popular Culture (Volume 3), the album sold half a million copies in the United States in 1989.

Although the album is called A Night to Remember, Lauper jokingly preferred to call it A Night to Forget'', given its poor reviews and disappointing sales, compounded by the problems she encountered with producer and boyfriend David Wolf⁠f during the production of the album. Although not certified by RIAA, BPI and others trade associations, according to Lauper's official website the album was certified platinum in Australia and United Kingdom and gold in Germany, Italy and United States. As of November 4, 1989 the album had sold 1.3 million copies worldwide.

Track listing

Notes
 In 2013, the 2008 Japanese remaster was reissued on BSCD2 format, with the same 2008 track listing.
 Tracks 13 and 14 are bonus tracks on the 2008 Japanese remastered mini-LP version, as well as its 2013 reissue.
 Track 14 recorded at the Summer Sonic Festival on August 12, 2007, in Chiba, Japan.

Personnel

Musicians

 Cyndi Lauper – lead vocals, backing vocals, dulcimer, arrangements 
 Jeff Bova – keyboards, arrangements 
 Tommy Mandel – keyboards
 John Turi – keyboards, saxophone
 Peter Wood – keyboards
 Rockin' Dopsie (Alton Jay Rubin) – accordion
 Bobby Bandiera – guitar 
 Eric Clapton – guitar (9)
 Dave Dale – guitar
 Rick Derringer – guitar
 John McCurry – guitar, coral sitar
 Rob Newhouse – guitar
 Paul Pesco – guitar
 Bootsy Collins – bass
 Leigh Foxx – bass
 Neil Jason – bass
 Bakithi Khumalo – bass 
 T.M. Stevens – bass
 Tom "T-Bone" Wolk – bass
 Steve Ferrone – drums
 Jimmy Bralower – drum programming, arrangements 
 Joe Bellia – drum machine
 Carole Steele – percussion
 George Recile – triangle
 Lennie Petze – arrangements (1-5, 7, 9, 10, 12)
 Eric "ET" Thorngren – arrangements (1-5, 7, 9-12)
 Billy Steinberg – arrangements (6, 8)
 Phil Ramone – arrangements (7, 11)
 Larry Blackmon – backing vocals 
 Angela Clemmons-Patrick – backing vocals
 Gordon Grody – backing vocals 
 Tomi Jenkins – backing vocals 
 Tom Kelly – backing vocals
 Nathan Leftenant – backing vocals
 Franke Previte – backing vocals 
 Frank Simms – backing vocals
 George Simms – backing vocals
 David Spinner – backing vocals

Technical
 Cyndi Lauper – producer
 Lennie Petze – producer (1-6, 8, 9, 12)
 Phil Ramone – producer (7, 11)
 Eric "ET" Thorngren – producer (10), recording
 David Wolff – executive producer
 Gary Lyons – recording
 Gary Wright – additional engineer, assistant engineer, recording (12)
 Tim Leitner – additional engineer, assistant engineer
 Rich Travali – additional engineer, assistant engineer
 Craig Vogel – additional engineer, assistant engineer
 Joe Pirrera – assistant engineer
 Dave McNair – mixing (12)
 George Marino – mastering at Sterling Sound (New York City)
 John Doelp – product manager

Artwork
 Cyndi Lauper – art direction, design
 Stacy Drummond – art direction, design 
 Chip Simons – photography
 David Tabatsky – fire juggler on album cover

Accolades

|-
|rowspan="1"|1990
|"I Drove All Night"
|Grammy Award for Best Female Rock Vocal Performance
|

Charts

Weekly charts

Year-end charts

Certifications and sales

External links
 A Night to Remember at Discogs

References

1989 albums
Albums produced by Phil Ramone
Cyndi Lauper albums
Epic Records albums